is a railway station in Kita-ku, Osaka, Japan on the Hankyu Kobe Line and the Hankyu Takarazuka Line, and is operated by Hankyu Railway.
In past, there was a car stop on the Hanshin Railway Kita-Osaka Line in the west side of this station on the Hankyu Railway lines.

Layout
The station consists of four tracks and two island platforms, each serving one line. Trains of the Kyoto Line run alongside the Kobe Line and the Takarazuka Line, but do not stop at Nakatsu. Officially the tracks for Kyoto Line are treated as express tracks for Takarazuka Line.

The Kyoto Line services do not stop at this station because of the absence of any platforms on this line.

History

3 August 1914 - Nakatsu Station on the Hanshin Railway Kita-Osaka Line opened.
4 November 1925 - Nakatsu Station on the Hanshin Kyuko Railway (present: Hankyu) lines opened.
5 September 1926 - The Hanshin Kyuko Railway lines from Umeda to Juso were elevated. Nakatsu Station became an elevated station serving 4 tracks, 2 tracks for one line.
6 May 1975 - The Hanshin Railway Kita-Osaka Line was abolished.
21 December 2013 - Station numbering was introduced to all Hankyu stations with this station being designated as station number HK-02.

Adjacent stations

Past line

References 

Railway stations in Japan opened in 1914
Railway stations in Osaka Prefecture
Hankyū Kōbe Main Line
Hankyu Railway Takarazuka Line
Railway stations in Japan opened in 1925
Railway stations closed in 1975